Lambert House may refer to:

Lambert House (Monticello, Arkansas), listed on the National Register of Historic Places (NRHP) in Drew County
David Lambert House, Wilton, Connecticut, listed on the NRHP in Fairfield County, Connecticut
Furr-Lambert House, Clarkesville, Georgia, listed on the NRHP in Habersham County, Georgia
Lambert House (Convent, Louisiana), listed on the NRHP in St. James Parish, Louisiana
Thomas Lambert House, Rowley, Massachusetts, listed on the NRHP in Massachusetts
Lambert-Parent House, Union City, Ohio, listed on the NRHP in Ohio
Lambert House (Seattle, Washington), an LGBT community center